Cosmic Crusader is a fixed shooter video game for IBM PC compatibles programmed by Michael Abrash and published in 1982 by Funtastic as a self-booting disk.

External links
Review in PC Magazine
Review in PC World

1982 video games
Fixed shooters
Video games developed in the United States
Funtastic games
Single-player video games